This article contains information about the literary events and publications of 1811.

Events
March 25 – The University of Oxford expels the first-year undergraduate Percy Bysshe Shelley after he and Thomas Jefferson Hogg refuse to answer questions on The Necessity of Atheism, a pamphlet they have published anonymously. Earlier this year, Shelley, as "A Gentleman of the University of Oxford", has published in London Poetical Essay on the Existing State of Things, containing a 172-line anti-monarchy, anti-war poem in support of Peter Finnerty (jailed this year for libel against Lord Castlereagh) and dedicated to Harriet Westbrook. Shelley's Gothic fiction St. Irvyne; or, The Rosicrucian: A Romance, published under the same designation and dated this year was actually issued in December 1810.
June – Walter Scott buys a farm at Abbotsford, Scotland, and commences building his future residence, Abbotsford House.
October 30 – Jane Austen publishes her first novel: Sense and Sensibility ("by a lady") at her own expense in three volumes, priced at 15 shillings, in Thomas Egerton's Military Library (Whitehall, London).
November 4 – Lord Byron meets Thomas Campbell and Thomas Moore at the home of Samuel Rogers, where the company discusses literary topics.
November 21 – German poet Heinrich von Kleist shoots his terminally ill lover Henriette Vogel and then himself, on the shore of the Kleiner Wannsee near Potsdam.
unknown dates
Friedrich Koenig, with the assistance of Andreas Friedrich Bauer, produces the first steam printing press, in London.
The first complete publication of the Bible in the Ume Sami language appears.

New books

Fiction
Jane Austen – Sense and Sensibility
Mary Brunton – Self-Control
Charlotte Dacre – The Passions
Friedrich de la Motte Fouqué – Undine
Johann Peter Hebel – Schatzkästlein des rheinischen Hausfreundes
Rachel Hunter – The Schoolmistress
Heinrich von Kleist – Michael Kohlhaas
Mary Meeke – Stratagems Defeated
Lady Morgan – The Missionary: An Indian Tale
Emma Parker – Elfrida, Heiress of Belgrove
Percy Bysshe Shelley – St. Irvyne; or, The Rosicrucian
Elizabeth Thomas – Mortimer Hall

Drama
Marianne Chambers – Ourselves
 Richard Leigh – Where to Find a Friend

Poetry
Anna Maria Porter – Ballad Romances, and Other Poems
Thomas Pringle – The Institute: a Heroic Poem
Mary Russell Mitford – Christina, the Maid of the South Seas

Non-fiction
Johann Wolfgang von Goethe – Aus meinem Leben: Dichtung und Wahrheit (The Autobiography of Goethe: Truth and Poetry from my own Life)
Barthold G. Niebuhr – Roman History
John Roberton – On Diseases of the Generative System
Percy Bysshe Shelley – The Necessity of Atheism

Births
January 9 – Gilbert Abbott à Beckett, English humorist (died 1856)
February 1 – Arthur Henry Hallam, English poet (died 1833)
February 19 – Jules Sandeau, French dramatist and novelist (died 1883)
February 27 – Alexandru Hrisoverghi, Moldavian poet and translator (died 1837)
June 14 – Harriet Beecher Stowe, American novelist and abolitionist (died 1896)
July 9 – Fanny Fern, American journalist, novelist and children's writer (died 1872)
July 18 – William Makepeace Thackeray, English novelist and satirist (died 1863)
August 31 – Théophile Gautier, French poet and novelist (died 1872)
September 17 – August Blanche, Swedish writer and statesman (died 1868)
October 19 – Andreas Munch, Norwegian poet (died 1884)

Deaths
January 10 – Joseph Chénier, French poet and dramatist (born 1764)
March 7 – Juraj Fándly, Slovak non-fiction writer, entomologist and priest (born 1750)
May 7 – Richard Cumberland, English dramatist (born 1732)
July 28 – Heinrich Joseph von Collin, Austrian dramatist (born 1771)
September 14 – James Grahame, Scottish poet (born 1765)
September 30 – Thomas Percy, English ballad collector and bishop (born 1729)
November 21 – Heinrich von Kleist, German poet (suicide, born 1777)
December 19 – Marjorie Fleming, Scottish child writer (born 1803 in literature)

References

 
Years of the 19th century in literature